Robert Schaaf (born January 4, 1957) is a doctor, a director of the Missouri Doctors Mutual Insurance Co., a former Republican member of the Missouri Senate and a former member of the Missouri House of Representatives, and brother to Charles L. Schaaf. He formerly represented the 34th district in the Missouri Senate, which began in 2011 when his term in the Missouri House expired.

Schaaf was born in 1957 in St. Louis, Missouri, moving to St. Joseph as a youth. He graduated from Central High School in St. Joseph in 1975.  He went on to Missouri Western State College, where he earned a B.S. in mathematics in 1979, and St. Louis University School of Medicine, where he earned an M.D. in 1983. Schaaf married his wife Deborah that same year.

Schaaf is a member of the Buchanan County Medical Society (past president), the Missouri State Medical Association (councilor), the Missouri State Medical Foundation Board, Heartland Regional Medical Center Department of Family Practice (past chair), Missouri Pilot's Association, the Farm Bureau, the St. Joseph and Savannah Area Chambers of Commerce, and the Missouri Infection Control Advisory Board.

Schaaf was first elected to the Missouri House of Representatives in 2002, winning reelection in 2004, 2006, and 2008. In 2010, he ran for and won a seat in the Senate, and was reelected in 2014.

Schaaf sat on the following committees during his time in the House:
 Healthcare Transformation, Chair
 Health Care Policy,
 Budget
 Appropriations - Health, Mental Health, and Social Services
 Joint Committee on MO Health Net

Schaaf serves on the Advisory Council of Represent.Us, a nonpartisan anti-corruption organization.

Schaaf resides in St. Joseph, Missouri, with his wife Deborah Schoenlaub, and their two children, Robert and Renee.

Public profile
In 2012, Schaaf  filibustered and defeated a bill that would have created a statewide prescription drug monitoring program, which would have allowed physicians to identify patients who are taking too many opioid medications. Schaaf's comments drew criticism when he said of those who use opioids, "If they overdose and kill themselves, it just removes them from the gene pool." As of 2017, Missouri continues to be the only US state to not have a prescription monitoring program.

References
Official Manual, State of Missouri, 2005-2006. Jefferson City, MO: Secretary of State.

1957 births
Living people
Politicians from St. Louis
Republican Party members of the Missouri House of Representatives
Republican Party Missouri state senators
Missouri Western State University alumni
Saint Louis University alumni
Physicians from Missouri
21st-century American politicians